"Get'em Daddy" is a single by Cam'ron. A remix of the song appears on Cam'ron’s fifth studio album, Killa Season. On the remix of the song, he tells about the night he was shot in Washington, D.C. The remix also features Jim Jones, J.R. Writer and Hell Rell.

References

2006 singles
Cam'ron songs
2006 songs
Songs written by Cam'ron
Music videos directed by Dale Resteghini